Dorothee Bohle (born 1964) is a German political scientist and professor at the European University Institute in Florence. Her work focuses on international political economy, European integration and eastward enlargement, as well as transformation processes in Central and Eastern Europe. She won the 2013 Stein Rokkan Prize for Comparative Social Science Research for her book Capitalist Diversity on Europe's Periphery (co-authored with Béla Greskovits).

Career
Bohle studied political science in Hamburg, Berlin and Paris. Between 1994 and 1999, she worked at the Social Science Research Center in Berlin. She completed her doctorate at the Free University of Berlin in 2001. Between 2000 and 2016, she has taught international political economy at the Central European University in Budapest where, in 2013, she was appointed a professor. From 2016, she is a professor of social and political change at the European University Institute, in Florence, Italy.

Selected publications

Books 

 Bohle, D. & Greskovits, B., Capitalist Diversity on Europe's Periphery, Ithaca/London, Cornell University Press, 2012.
 Bohle, D., Europas neue Peripherie : Polens Transformation und transnationale Integration, Westfälisches Dampfboot, 2002.

Articles 

 Bohle, D., Mortgaging Europe's periphery, LSE ‘Europe in Question’ Discussion Paper, 2017/124
 Bohle, D., & Jacoby, W., Lean, special, or consensual? : vulnerability and external buffering in the small states of East-Central Europe, Comparative politics, 2017, Vol. 49, No. 2, pp. 191–212  
 Bohle, D., European integration, capitalist diversity and crises trajectories on Europe's Eastern periphery, New political economy, 2017, Vol. 23, No. 2, pp. 239-253

References

External links 

 Dorothee Bohle on EUI Cadmus

1964 births
20th-century women scientists
German political scientists
German women academics
German women scientists
Winners of the Stein Rokkan Prize for Comparative Social Science Research
Living people
Women political scientists